Lotusphere was an American annual conference hosted by Lotus Software (which later became an IBM software brand) from 1993 to 2017. In 2013, Lotusphere was re-branded as IBM Connect.

Except for the first conference, which took place in December 1993, Lotusphere was held in late January. It started with a reception party on Sunday night and continued on through the closing session on Thursday afternoon.  The conference was held at the Walt Disney World Swan and Dolphin hotels.  Most years it has used the additional space at Disney's Yacht and Beach Clubs.

In addition to the annual conference in Florida, between 1997 and 2000 there was also an annual Lotusphere Europe conference, first in Nice (1997) and then in Berlin (1999).

"Lotusphere Comes to You" (LCTY) events were for a few years held by local IBM Business Partners, where some of the information presented at conference was presented and business partners could connect with local users who were not able to attend the big event. LCTY was held in over 50 countries around the world. Since 2007, LCTY in Sofia, Bulgaria was organized by IBS Bulgaria with the support of IBM Bulgaria. The event covered news around Lotus Software as well as sessions emphasizing on local business needs and Lotus Domino development. These events were later replaced by local LUG (Lotus User Group) events like IamLUG (later Icon US), MWLUG, ILUG, UKLUG (later Icon UK) and many others.

Toward the end of 2012, IBM stopped using the Lotus brand and renamed the conference to IBM Connect.  It was renamed again in 2015 to IBM ConnectED, but changed back to IBM Connect in 2016.  The venue changed from the Disney Swan and Dolphin to the Hilton in Orlando. In 2017 the conference was moved to the Moscone Centre in San Francisco, and the date of the conference moved to the third week of February. In 2018, IBM Connect, along with several other IBM conferences, was merged into the IBM Think conference.

Agenda
The typical agenda started with an opening general session on Monday, followed by breakout sessions through the rest of the morning and afternoon where different presentations occur simultaneously in different conference rooms, allowing attendees to choose which one they want to go to.  Each breakout session was typically an hour long, with pauses in the schedule to allow attendees to mingle and walk to their next choice of breakout session.  Tuesday and Wednesday also had six or seven of these breakout sessions throughout the day.

Originally, Thursday was the last day of the conference, with a few breakout sessions in the morning, then a large "Ask the Developers" session where attendees are allowed to ask questions directly to a panel of IBM/Lotus employees involved in making the software. The last event of the conference is a closing session. 
Starting in 2014 the conference was shortened one day, ending on Wednesday instead.

The opening and closing sessions typically had a form of entertainment and a guest speaker, as well as executives and key employees sharing news and demonstrations of what was planned for the near future.

Breakout Sessions
In 2008, there were 197 different presentations scheduled during the breakout sessions, scheduled across 18 slots, giving attendees an average of eleven choices per session slot.  Each breakout session lasted about an hour.  Breakouts were split into several categories called "tracks".  Common tracks were:
 1) Futures and Innovations  Glimpses of technologies and innovations coming out of IBM and Lotus Research Labs.
 2) Application Development  Presentations on custom application development, ranging from paper prototyping to application development techniques specific to Lotus software products.
 3) Planning and Managing Your Collaboration Infrastructure  Information for administrators and decision makers on architecture, features and capabilities, deployment, and system management.
 4) Best Practices  Tips and tricks for developers, administrators, usually technical and tactical.

In addition to these four tracks, there was sometimes a fifth track with a title and content around "Customer References" or "Sponsor Sessions".  There were also "Hands-on" and "JumpStart" sessions.
 Hands-on  These were hands-on classes lasting 1¾ hours, taking place in rooms set up in a classroom style with tables and computers.  Attendance was limited such that there are one to two attendees per computer.
 JumpStart  JumpStart sessions were offered during the day on Sunday, usually lasting about 1½ hours, giving an in-depth presentation on a topic.

History and Statistics

References

External links 
 Spreadsheet of Lotusphere Events
 Video: Lotusphere 2008 in 60 Seconds, a 68-second recap of major announcements made during the Opening General Session at Lotusphere 2008

Computer conferences